The Elminster Series is a series of fantasy novels by author Ed Greenwood. The novels are set in the Forgotten Realms setting created by Greenwood for the Dungeons & Dragons fantasy role-playing game. The series focuses on the titular character Elminster who was a key figure in several of Greenwood's other novels set in the Forgotten Realms setting. Elminster was a powerful wizard, known as "The One Who Walks" and eventually "The Sage of Shadowdale." This series seeks to present the backstory of Elminster's life as well as provide a history of other important events in this particular fantasy setting.

Works included
 Elminster: The Making of a Mage (1994); 
 Elminster In Myth Drannor (1997); 
 The Temptation of Elminster (1998); 
 Elminster In Hell (2001); 
 Elminster's Daughter (2004); 
 The Annotated Elminster (2007) - An anthology of the first three books in the series.
 Elminster Must Die (2010) - The debut 4th Edition appearance of one of the Forgotten Realms world's most iconic characters. 
 Bury Elminster Deep (2011) 
 Elminster Enraged (2012) 
 The Herald (2014) 
 Spellstorm (2015) 
 Death Masks (2016)

Plot summary

Elminster: The Making of a Mage

As a young boy, tending sheep in the fertile countryside of the nation of Athlanthar, Elminster has his first encounter with magic: the destruction of his entire hometown by a vicious dragon-riding magelord. The only survivor of the tragedy, Elminster joins a troupe of bandits and later a gang of thieves in the nearby city of Hastarl. Fed up with the rule and power of arrogant mages, Elminster sneaks into a temple of Mystra with the intent of defacing it, leading to a face-to-face confrontation with the goddess. Instead of unleashing her wrath upon the upstart youth, she questions him, and based upon his wise and honest answers and his exceptional potential, Mystra instructs Elminster in the ways of magic and he becomes a powerful cleric and mage, one of her Chosen, a title rarely given and accompanied by a host of powers and duties.

Elminster in Myth Drannor

After winning the freedom of Athlanthar from the power-mad magelords, becoming crowned king, and subsequently abdicating his throne, Elminster follows the edict of Mystra to enter the forest of Cormanthor. Stumbling upon a patrol of elves beset by monsters, he rescues the sole surviving elf and comforts him in his dying moments. Given a sacred duty to return the family's mind stone (kiira) to its rightful place, he sneaks into the City of Cormanthor, under threat of death (as elves will kill any non-elves on sight in Cormanthor) to return the kiira and complete his vow. Though not accepted by most of the noble caste, Elminster convinces the ruling Coronal and the powerful guardian of the forest the Shrinshee to trust and teach him. Surviving many tests of strength and will, as well as attempts at assassination, he learns much powerful elven magic, and plays a large part in the eventually seeding of Cormanthor's Mythal.

The Temptation of Elminster

Tempted by Mystra and Shar, Elminster must choose to follow his heart or his goddess.

Elminster in Hell

Thrown through a portal into the Hell-plane of Avernos, Elminster is captured by the outcast archdevil Nergal and struggles to survive his memories being replayed and torn from his mind.

Elminster's Daughter

This novel views the long-term effect of Elminster's meddling on the nation of Cormyr, which Elminster played no small part in creating and protecting, through the lens of his daughter, Narnra, a thief from Waterdeep.

Elminster Must Die

When the goddess of magic was murdered, Elminster's world shattered. Once the most powerful wizard in the world, immortal, beloved of the goddess of magic, and the bane of villainy, he is now a tired old man. He is powerful but mortal, and with all the enemies a man who makes a habit of saving the world tends to accumulate.

To make matters worse, Elminster has needs—feeding powerful magic items to the Simbul, his lover, is the only thing that keeps her sane—but their increasingly risky collection leads his enemies right to him.

Reception
Elminster in Hell was reviewed by Don Bassingthwaite in the Winter 2002 issue of Black Gate.

Bury Elminster Deep received a positive review from California Bookwatch, which called it "a top pick for any fantasy collection".

References

Forgotten Realms novel series